Unlimited Love is the twelfth studio album by the American rock band the Red Hot Chili Peppers, released through Warner Records on April 1, 2022. Produced by Rick Rubin, the album marks the return of guitarist John Frusciante, who left the band in 2009 and rejoined in 2019. A second full studio album, Return of the Dream Canteen, was recorded during the same sessions and was released on October 14, 2022.

The first single, "Black Summer", was released on February 4, 2022, and became the Chili Peppers' fourteenth number-one on the Billboard Alternative Songs chart. "These Are the Ways" followed on March 31, 2022. A world tour began in June 2022.

Unlimited Love received generally positive reviews. It debuted at number one in 16 countries, including the United States, where it was the Chili Peppers' first number-one album since Stadium Arcadium (2006).

Background
Following the tour for their eleventh album, The Getaway (2016), the Red Hot Chili Peppers began writing their next album with their guitarist Josh Klinghoffer. However, the singer, Anthony Kiedis, and the bassist, Flea, were unhappy with their progress. They wondered if they could involve the guitarist John Frusciante, who had recorded several albums with the Chili Peppers but left in 2009 and moved into making electronic music. Frusciante said: "Flea had put the idea [of rejoining] in my head and I was sitting there with the guitar thinking that I hadn't written any rock music in so long. Could I still do that?"

On December 15, 2019, the Chili Peppers announced that, after 10 years, Frusciante had rejoined, replacing Klinghoffer. In an interview, Klinghoffer said there was no animosity: "It's absolutely John's place to be in that band ... I'm happy that he's back with them." Flea said separating from Klinghoffer had been difficult, but that "artistically, in terms of being able to speak the same [musical] language, it was easier working with John. Getting back into a room and starting to play and letting the thing unfold… was really exciting." After reuniting with Frusciante, at his request, the band played through songs from their first three albums. The drummer, Chad Smith, said Frusciante "wanted to reconnect with the band that he fell in love with”, and Kiedis said the exercise was about getting "back to basics" and playing together without expectations.

On February 8, 2020, Frusciante performed with the Chili Peppers for the first time in 13 years, at a memorial service held by the Tony Hawk Foundation for late film producer Andrew Burkle, son of billionaire Ronald Burkle. Shows were scheduled for three festivals that May, but were cancelled due to the COVID-19 pandemic.

Production and music
After working with Danger Mouse on The Getaway, the Chili Peppers brought in Rick Rubin, who has produced several of their most successful albums. Rubin said seeing their first rehearsal after Frusciante's return made him cry: "It was so thrilling to see that group of people back together because they made such great music for so long and it really hit me in an emotional way."

Rehearsals were halted in 2020 due to the COVID-19 pandemic. They resumed in 2021 at Rubin's Shangri-La studio in Malibu, with around 100 new songs to work on. The band recorded almost 50 tracks, with the band intending to release 40 of the tracks as one album, spread over seven physical discs. The band's label, Warner Bros. Records, resisted this release strategy, with a "compromise" being reached where the band split thirty-four songs across two separate studio albums. The second album from the Unlimited Love recording sessions, Return of the Dream Canteen, was released on October 14, 2022.

Music 
Reviewers described the album as funk rock and alternative rock. NME said it shared the "melancholic riffmaking, anthemic choruses and softly-sung melodies" of Frusciante's previous work with the Chili Peppers, but introduced new "grungey" and acoustic elements.

Release and promotion 
The Red Hot Chili Peppers announced Unlimited Love on February 4, 2022. The first single, "Black Summer", was released on February 4, backed by a music video directed by Deborah Chow. It became the Chili Peppers' fourteenth number-one single on the Billboard charts and their 26th top-ten single on the Alternative Songs chart. The band previewed the new album by releasing "Poster Child" as a promotional single on March 4, backed by a music video directed by Julien & Thami, followed by "Not the One" on March 24. "These Are the Ways", the second single, was released on March 31 with a music video directed by Malia James.

The Chili Peppers performed their first show to promote the album at the Fonda Theatre on April 1. This was followed by performances on Jimmy Kimmel Live! The Tonight Show Starring Jimmy Fallon,The Howard Stern Show, at Amoeba Music and at the Yaamava' Resort & Casino in April and at the New Orleans Jazz & Heritage Festival in May. A scheduled appearance at the Billboard Music Awards was canceled. SiriusXM launched the Whole Lotta Red Hot channel on April 1. The channel features track-by-track commentary on Unlimited Love and  an exclusive concert for subscribers later in the year.

On June 4, the Red Hot Chili Peppers began a global stadium tour, starting in Seville, Spain and that will continue into 2023 in support of Return of the Dream Canteen. The shows are supported by acts including the Strokes, A$AP Rocky, Beck, Haim, St. Vincent, Anderson .Paak, Nas, Thundercat, King Princess and Post Malone.

Reception 

At Metacritic, which assigns a normalized rating out of 100 to reviews from mainstream publications, Unlimited Love has an average score of 71 based on 20 reviews, indicating "generally favorable reviews".

Brittany Spanos of Rolling Stone gave the album four out of five stars, writing: "more than anything, this record feels like a coming home. There's a certain magic that happens with these four musicians, and Frusciante's absence always leaves a piece of the puzzle missing." Ali Shutler of NME gave the album four out of five stars, writing that "there's a lot to 'Unlimited Love', both in scale and ambition. It’s at once familiar – without being boring – and fresh." Clash rated the album 9/10, with reviewer Isabella Miller describing it as a "celebration of union, friendship, and life, all manifested across 17 tracks." In a glowing review, Paolo Ragusa of Consequence praised the lyrics and musicianship, writing that it is "fascinating to hear a band nearly forty years into their career try to reach their audience in a different way."

Some critics found the album mediocre; Steve Beebee of Kerrang! wrote that "It's a good record; just not a great one...There are, however, way too many tracks that miss their marks, trying to supplant the old energy with wisdom; the magik with maturity." Sam Sodomsky of Pitchfork gave it 6.2 out of 10, saying the band "[balanced] the risk of self-parody with the need to live up to people's nostalgia, knowing they've already written the music they'll be remembered for but still wanting to keep the ride going".

Mark Richardson of the Wall Street Journal said the album lacked energy and purpose, and that it "features their classic sound but little that's new or exciting". Phil Mongredien of The Guardian described the album as "bloated and self-indulgent ... with barely a memorable melody or thought-provoking lyric among its 17 tracks". Ryan Leas of Stereogum found that, aside from some highlights, "the crime of Unlimited Love, with all its weight within RHCP's narrative and all the excitement some might've felt, is that the bulk of the album is just completely unmemorable".

The music video for "Black Summer" won the Best Rock award in the 2022 MTV Video Music Awards and the band was also nominated for Group of the Year. The band now has 30 nominations at the MTV Video Music Awards since 1990 and these are their first nominations since 2006 when they were nominated for "Dani California". The band also received the Global Icon Award and performed at the awards show.They also received a nomination for Best Rock Band at the 2022 MTV Europe Music Awards.

The band was nominated for three American Music Awards for Favorite Rock Album (Unlimited Love), Favorite Rock Song ("Black Summer") and Favorite Rock Aritst. Fans can vote for the band at VoteAMAs.com. The awards show was held on November 20, 2022.

Commercial performance 
The album was a worldwide commercial success, debuting at number-one in 16 different countries including Argentina, Australia, Austria, Canada, Croatia, France, Germany, Hungary, Ireland, Netherlands, New Zealand, Portugal, Scotland, Switzerland, United Kingdom and United States.

In its home country of the United States, Unlimited Love was the band's second number one on the Billboard 200, and the first since 2006's Stadium Arcadium album selling 97,500 equivalent album units. It marked the longest gap ever between number one albums since Celine Dion waited 17 years and nearly eight months between number one albums. Unlimited Love  had the largest week, by equivalent album units and album sales, for any rock album in over a year since Paul McCartney's McCartney III album in January 2021. The sales for Unlimited Love were boosted by various vinyl variants and special editions of the album. The album sold 38,500 copies on vinyl which were the largest sales week for an album on vinyl in 2022 and the second largest sales week for a rock album since 1991.

In the United Kingdom, Unlimited Love debuted at number one, becoming the band's first chart-topper in eleven years since 2011's I'm With You. Unlimited Love sold 27,426 units in its first week, 20,989 of which came from physical formats. Digitally, the album sold 2,315 downloads and streamed 4,122 album-equivalent units.

Track listing

Personnel
Red Hot Chili Peppers
 Anthony Kiedis – lead vocals
 Flea – bass (all tracks), piano (track 4), trumpet (3, 15)
 John Frusciante – electric guitar (1–16), backing vocals (1, 3, 5–9, 11–14), co-lead vocals (16), synthesizer (2, 3, 5, 7, 11, 12, 14, 16, 17), Mellotron (5), acoustic guitar (11, 14, 17)
 Chad Smith – drums (1, 3–16), percussion (2), tambourine (1, 4), bass (2), shaker (5, 7, 15)

Additional musicians
 Cory Henry – organ (5, 15)
 Lenny Castro – percussion (5)
 Mauro Refosco – percussion (3, 8, 10, 11, 13)
 Nate Walcott – trumpet (3)
 Josh Johnson – saxophone (3)
 Vikram Devasthali – trombone (3)
 Mathew Tollings – piano (1, 6)
 Aura T-09 – backing vocals (4)

Production
 Rick Rubin – production
 Ryan Hewitt – mixing, recording
 Bernie Grundman – vinyl mastering
 Vlado Meller - CD and digital mastering
 Jeremy Lubsey – CD and digital assistant mastering
 Bo Bodnar – engineering
 Phillip Broussard Jr. – engineering
 Jason Lader – engineering
 Ethan Mates – engineering
 Dylan Neustadter – engineering
 Jonathan Pfarr – assistant engineering
 Chaz Sexton – assistant engineering
 Chris Warren – band technician
 Henry Trejo – band technician
 Lawrence Malchose – studio technician
 Charlie Bolois – studio technician
 Gage Freeman – co-ordinator production
 Eric Lynn – co-originator production
 Sami Bañuelos – band assistant

Imagery
 Clara Balzary – photography
 Sarah Zoraya and Aura T-09 – design

Charts

Weekly charts

Year-end charts

Certifications

References

External links
 

2022 albums
Albums produced by Rick Rubin
Red Hot Chili Peppers albums
Warner Records albums